Fiona Joy Nash (née Morton; born 6 May 1965) is a former Australian politician. She served as a Senator for New South Wales from 2005 to 2017, representing the National Party. She was the party's deputy leader from 2016 to 2017 and was a cabinet minister in the Turnbull Government.

Nash was a farmer in Crowther, New South Wales, prior to entering politics. She was elected to the Senate at the 2004 federal election. After a period as whip, she was elected as deputy Senate leader of the National Party in 2008. Nash was an assistant minister in the Abbott Government from 2013 to 2015. In the Turnbull Government she served as Minister for Rural Health (2015–2016), Regional Development (2016–2017), Regional Communications (2016–2017), and Local Government and Territories (2016–2017). Nash was elevated to cabinet upon her election as deputy leader of the National Party in February 2016, the first woman to hold the position. Her political career came to an end as a result of the parliament eligibility crisis of 2017, where she was disqualified from parliament for holding British citizenship in breach of section 44 of the constitution.

Early life
Nash was born in Sydney on 6 May 1965, the daughter of Joy Stuart and Raemond Lothian Morton; her mother was born in Sydney and her father was born in Scotland. Her parents met in the UK where her mother was working as a doctor, moving to Australia in the early 1960s. They divorced in 1973 and she was subsequently raised by her mother.

Nash completed a Bachelor of Arts in liberal studies at the Mitchell College of Advanced Education. In 1991, she and her husband bought a farm in Crowther, New South Wales. They engaged in mixed farming, initially growing grain and bred Merino sheep for wool but later switching to sheep agistment and diversifying their crops.

Politics
Nash joined the National Party in 1995. She was elected to the party's New South Wales state council in 1997 and to the state executive in 1999. She was also a delegate to the federal council from 2002 and treasurer of the women's federal council. Between 1999 and 2004, Nash worked as a staffer for National Party federal ministers Mark Vaile, Larry Anthony, and De-Anne Kelly.

Nash was elected to the Senate at the 2004 federal election, to a term beginning on 1 July 2005. She was only the third woman from her party elected to the Senate, after Agnes Robertson and Florence Bjelke-Petersen. In 2008, she was appointed Shadow Parliamentary Secretary for Water Resources and Conservation on the Opposition frontbench, but was asked to resign by Opposition Leader Malcolm Turnbull when she expressed her support for a motion by the Australian Greens to block the introduction of up-front tax breaks for carbon sinks. She did so, and subsequently crossed the floor with four other National senators to vote for the motion. After the 2010 election she returned to the Opposition frontbench when appointed Shadow Parliamentary Secretary for Regional Education by Opposition Leader Tony Abbott in September 2010.

Following the 2013 federal election, Nash was appointed Assistant Minister for Health in the Abbott Government. In February 2014 she came under scrutiny after it was revealed that her chief of staff, Alastair Furnival, held shares in a lobby group, which culminated with his resignation the same month. In March the Senate formally censured Nash after she missed a deadline to produce a letter Furnival apparently wrote, outlining how he would avoid conflicts of interest, given that his wife owned a lobbying company, Australian Public Affairs, which represented junk food clients. Nash was appointed Minister for Rural Health on 21 September 2015, when Malcolm Turnbull replaced Tony Abbott as prime minister.

On 11 February 2016, Nash was elected deputy leader of the National Party, the first woman to hold the position. She replaced Barnaby Joyce, who had succeeded Warren Truss as party leader upon his retirement. Nash was consequently appointed to cabinet and given the additional portfolios of Minister for Regional Development and Minister for Regional Communications. She was also appointed Minister for Local Government and Territories on 19 July 2016.

Parliamentary eligibility and disqualification
On 17 August 2017, Nash became embroiled in the Australian parliamentary eligibility crisis, when she informed the Senate that she had received advice that she was a British citizen. Her citizenship had been acquired at birth, by descent from her Scottish-born father. She completed a declaration of renunciation of British citizenship on 18 August 2017. Her eligibility was considered by the High Court of Australia alongside numerous other cases of potential breaches of Section 44 of the Australian Constitution. On 27 October 2017, the court ruled that Nash had been ineligible to have been elected. She was replaced by Liberal candidate Jim Molan.

Later activities
Nash took the role of Strategic Adviser, Regional Development at Charles Sturt University in early 2018.

In December 2021, Nash was appointed as Australia's first Regional Education Commissioner by the Morrison Government, with the objective of championing greater equity between regional and city education.

Personal life
Nash has two sons with her husband David Nash, whom she married in 1989.

References

External links
 
 

|-

|-

|-

|-

|-

|-

1965 births
Abbott Government
Living people
Government ministers of Australia
Members of the Australian Senate
Members of the Australian Senate for New South Wales
National Party of Australia members of the Parliament of Australia
People from Young, New South Wales
Politicians from Sydney
Turnbull Government
Women members of the Australian Senate
21st-century Australian politicians
21st-century Australian women politicians
Women government ministers of Australia
Australian people of Scottish descent